Hoseyniyeh-ye Mir Shenan (also Romanized as Ḩoseynīyeh-ye Mīr Shenān) is a village in Azadeh Rural District, Moshrageh District, Ramshir County, Khuzestan Province, Iran. At the 2006 census, its population was 123, in 24 families.

References 

Populated places in Ramshir County